The  Fort Wayne Freedom was a professional indoor football team based in Fort Wayne, Indiana.

The team was most recently a member of the Continental Indoor Football League, but originally began play in 2003 as an expansion team in the National Indoor Football League.

The Freedom were the original indoor football team to be based in Fort Wayne. After four years of being the only indoor team in Fort Wayne, the franchise folded and the Fort Wayne Fusion was established as part of the AF2 in 2007. 

After a failed year in AF2, the Freedom came back in 2008 with new ownership and continued through the 2009 season. In 2010, another indoor team, the Fort Wayne FireHawks, replaced the Freedom in the CIFL. 

The owner of the second version of the Freedom was Bill Fahlsing. The Freedom played their home games at Allen County War Memorial Coliseum in Fort Wayne.

Franchise history

2003

Schedule

2004
 The original Fort Wayne Freedom was a professional indoor football team.  They were most recently a member of the United Indoor Football league (UIF), and played their home games at the Allen County War Memorial Coliseum. In 2004, the Freedom set the single game record for attendance at 10,225.

Schedule
 # = set single game indoor football attendance record with 10,225 fans.

2004 stats do not include a NIFL playoff games with the Show Me Believers and at Ohio Valley (Wheeling, West Virginia)***

2005
The 2005 season was the best season in franchise history. This was the first year in the UIF, the team moved to the association, after two years in the NIFL. Finishing a league-best 14-2, and winning the UIF Midwest Division. In the first-round of the UIF playoffs. The Tennessee Valley Raptors upset Freedom 57-22.

Schedule

2006
As Matt Land left the Freedom to become head coach at Tri-State University in NCAA Division III. The Freedom selected offensive coordinator Dan Pifer to be their new head coach. Pifer would later serve as the offensive coordinator for NCAA Division III Tri-State, later renamed Trine, under former coach Matt Land. He had worked previously as an assistant coach at the University of St. Francis, an NAIA institution, and NCAA Division II Hillsdale College in Michigan. Pifer also was a high school assistant and played quarterback at the University of California in Pennsylvania. After completing its fourth year of football, the assets of the Freedom were sold to Jeremy Golden, who moved the franchise to AF2. Meanwhile, leaders with United Indoor Football did find an ownership group (that included investor Bill Bean) that also sought a lease with Randy Brown and the Memorial Coliseum. Brown opted to go with the AF2 franchise.

Rumored move to AF2
The team had been heavily rumored to move to AF2 for quite some time, and Coffey sold the assets to Golden on November 10, 2006. Golden had already applied for and was awarded an AF2 franchise, but because only the assets and not the Freedom's corporate entity were sold, the Fort Wayne Fusion AF2 franchise is not a continuation of the UIF team.

Schedule

2008: The return of the Freedom
In October 2007, the group Fort Wayne Sports Partners owned by Todd Ellis, John Christener and Mike McCaffrey, adopted the name Freedom as a new franchise in 2008. Only the name, and some players from the 2003–2006 teams were associated with the original franchise.
. The team also announced that Eddie Brown, who had coached the Fusion the season before, would be the head coach for the Freedom, who would be joining the Continental Indoor Football League. Since the Fusion ownership had failed mid season in 2007, Brown and McCaffrey made majority owner Todd Ellis guaranteed them both that if the team ran into financial trouble they would not be responsible for any of the unpaid bills. The teams poor financial history left every part of owning the franchise more difficult, even as far as ownership of the team's turf. The team's new ownership also showed signs of financial trouble right away, as they were banned from the CIFL in January 2008, for failing to pay league dues. These troubles made Brown and McCaffrey question the ownership, and Ellis fired them both, replacing Brown with Willie Davis Jr. and McCaffrey with himself. The Freedom were able to work out a deal with CIFL Commissioner, Jeff Spitaleri, and paid their $22,500 league fee, which removed the ban and allowed the team to join the CIFL in 2008.

Schedule

Standings

2009
In September, 2008, the Freedom announced that former Freedom Assistant GM Brad Harris (who was with the original Freedom from 2003–2005) had been hired as GM. Head coach Matt Land also returned for the 2009 to coach the team for the full season.

In 2008, Land, who had been the team's head coach for the 2005 campaign, was asked by team co-owner William Fahlsing to lead the team for the final four games of the season when original head coach Willie Davis, Jr. was fired the morning of the May 17 game against the Chicago Slaughter. With only 15 minutes of practice, Land's second term began with a 41-33 loss to the Slaughter, despite a solid performance by the Freedom defense.

In 2009, the Freedom had success on the field but struggled financially.  Toward the end of the 2009 season players were not paid promptly and then not at all.  Team Co-owners Bill Fahlsing and Mark Chappius were forced to ask for public support to help get the team through the season.  Despite the financial issue with salaries, the players continued to play for the Freedom and won the Eastern Conference Championship over the Marion Mayhem but lost the 2009 CIFL championship game to the Chicago Slaughter.

Schedule

Standings

Fans
The Freedom Force is the official fan club of the Fort Wayne Freedom.

Notable coaches

Head coaches
Note: Statistics are correct through the end of the 2009 Continental Indoor Football League season.

Coaching staff

Season-by-season results

See also
 History of sports in Fort Wayne, Indiana

References

United Indoor Football teams
Former Continental Indoor Football League teams
Sports in Fort Wayne, Indiana
Defunct American football teams in Indiana
American football teams established in 2003
American football teams disestablished in 2006
American football teams established in 2007
American football teams disestablished in 2009
2003 establishments in Indiana
2006 disestablishments in Indiana
2008 establishments in Indiana
2009 disestablishments in Indiana